Jessica Hemmings is a British academic and writer.

Early life
Born in Wales, Hemmings spent her childhood in Indonesia and America. She graduated with a BFA in Textile Design from the Rhode Island School of Design in 1999 and an MA in Comparative Literature from the University of London’s School of Oriental and African Studies in 2000. Her PhD, awarded by the University of Edinburgh in 2006, is published by kalliope paperbacks under the title, Yvonne Vera: The Voice of Cloth (2008).

Career
Hemmings is currently Professor of Craft, University of Gothenburg, Sweden. Previous academic appointments include Professor of Visual Culture and Head of the School of Visual Culture at the National College of Art & Design, Dublin (2012-2016); Deputy Director of Research and Head of Context, Edinburgh College of Art, University of Edinburgh (2010-2012); Associate Director of the Centre for Visual & Cultural Studies, Edinburgh College of Art (2008-2010); Reader in Textile Culture, Winchester School of Art, University of Southampton, England (2008). She is a member of the editorial boards of TEXTILE: the journal of cloth & culture (Taylor & Francis) and Craft Research (Intellect).

As a writer she has published Warp and Weft: Woven Textiles in Fashion, Art and Interiors (2012) and Yvonne Vera: The Voice of Cloth (2008), and edited three books. Based on her editorial project Cultural Threads, Hemmings curated Migrations, an international travelling exhibition gallery, which traveled 2015–2017 around the globe. The Cultural Threads book inspired Dutch curator Liza Swaving’s exhibition of the same name held at the TextielMuseum, Tilburg, the Netherlands (24 November – 12 May 2019).

Books
 The Textile Reader (second edition), Bloomsbury (9 February 2023), 
 Cultural Threads: Transnational Textiles Today, Bloomsbury Academic (15 January 2015), 
 Warp and Weft: Woven Textiles in Fashion, Art and Interiors, A&C Black Visual Arts (6 December 2012), 
 The Textile Reader, Berg Publishers (13 March 2012), 
 In the Loop: Knitting Now, Black Dog Press (11 May 2010), 
 Yvonne Vera: The Voice of Cloth, kalliope paperbacks; 1st Edition (1 January 2008),

Awards
2020–2023 Rita Bolland Fellowship at the Research Centre for Material Culture, the Netherlands

Selected Lectures
Nordic Textile Art Network, Reykjavik, Iceland (2019), Zeitz MOCCA, Cape Town, South Africa (2018), University of British Columbia, Canada (2017), ObjectSpace, New Zealand (2016), Design Canberra Festival, Australia (2015), SOFA Chicago New Voices Lecture (2012), Cranbrook Academy of Art (2012) INIVA, London (2009).

References

Welsh scholars and academics
Living people
Year of birth missing (living people)